The 2014–15 Florida A&M Rattlers basketball team represented Florida A&M University during the 2014–15 NCAA Division I men's basketball season. The Rattlers, led by first year head coach Byron Samuels, played their home games at the Teaching Gym and were members of the Mid-Eastern Athletic Conference. They finished the season 2–27, 2–14 in MEAC play to finish in last place. Due to failing to meet APR requirements, the Rattlers were banned from postseason play including the MEAC tournament.

After an 0–23 start, the Rattlers became the last team in Division I to get a win during the 2014–15 season with a 57–50 win over North Carolina A&T on February 14.

Roster

Schedule

|-
!colspan=9 style="background:#008000; color:#FFA500;"|  Regular season

References

Florida A&M Rattlers basketball seasons
Florida A and M
Florida AandM Rattlers basketball
Florida AandM Rattlers basketball